Jean-Georges Perrin (born 1971) is an IT serial-entrepreneur from Alsace, France. He was the longest standing elected board member of IIUG after Stuart Litel, the first non-US citizen elected to this board, and the first French IBM Champion.

IIUG and IBM 
Perrin was elected at the Board of Directors of IIUG in 2002. Perrin has been the first French citizen to become an IBM Champion in 2009, along with Jean-Marc Blaise. In January 2020, his IBM Champion title was renewed for the 12th consecutive time.

Career 
Perrin is an IT software engineer, lecturer, and serial entrepreneur. In 1995, he took part in the creation of Pandemonium, one of France’s first commercial ISP to be located outside of the Paris area, later acquired by ISION. In 2002, he co-founded Awoma, an ISV specialized in making Java development easier. In 2006, he founded GreenIvory, a pioneer in Content Marketing tools. GreenIvory France and GreenIvory Luxembourg closed in January 2014, GreenIvory America closed a little later. In 2015, Perrin joined 2CRSI Corporation as Chief Operations Officer (COO)., Since 2016, Perrin is consulting in software engineering, big data, and Apache Spark. He recently published Spark in Action, second edition covering data engineering with Spark and Java, Python, and Scala through Manning, the foreword was written by IBM’s Rob D. Thomas.

Publications and conferences 
Perrin has contributed to the defunct DB2 Magazine, to The Futurist magazine co-author with Elizabeth D. Leone. Perrin co-authored with Frederic Collet-Hahn a book on the C programming language in August 1992, while a student at the now-Université de Strasbourg. More recently, he authored two ebooks on Informix.

Perrin participates in numerous conferences and lectures at various schools and universities, including the Université de Strasbourg. Lately, he spoke at Spark Summit.

Other recognitions 
In 2012, Perrin was selected as one of 60 Alsatian entrepreneurs whose profiles were published in the Dernières Nouvelles d'Alsace on the occasion of the 60th anniversary of ADIRA, an agency that supports business in Alsace.

References 

1971 births
Living people
Businesspeople from Strasbourg
Informix
IBM people
Chief operating officers